Alles Door Oefening Den Haag (Dutch pronunciation: [ˈɑləs doːr ˈufənɪŋ dɛn ˈɦaːx]), commonly known by the abbreviated name ADO Den Haag [ˈaːdoː dɛn ˈɦaːx], is a Dutch association football club from the city of The Hague. During the 2015-16 campaign they competed in the Eredivisie and KNVB Beker competitions.

Eredivisie

League table

Results summary

Results by matchday

League matches

KNVB Cup

Player details

|}

Sources: Squad numbers, Eredivisie en KNVB Cup stats,

Transfers

In:

Out:

Sources: Transfers 2016-17

External links
Official website of ADO Den Haag 
Groen Geel Hart 
ADOFans.nl 
ADO formations at football-lineups.com 
northside fanside

References

ADO Den Haag seasons
ADO Den Haag